John Hayes (25 January 1643 – 22 March 1705) was an English Member of Parliament. He was a Member of Parliament (MP) for Winchelsea from 1698 to January 1701, and from November 1701 to 1702.

He died aged 62, leaving his assets to his daughter, Elizabeth St Leger née Hayes, Viscountess Doneraile, and her four children. She was the wife of Arthur St Leger, 1st Viscount Doneraile.

References

1643 births
1705 deaths
People from Winchelsea
Place of birth missing
English MPs 1698–1700
English MPs 1701–1702